Capalbo is a surname. Notable people with the surname include:

 Carla Capalbo, English-American food writer, journalist, and author
 Carmen Capalbo (1925–2010), American theater director 
 Marcelo Capalbo (born 1970), Uruguayan basketball coach and former player

Italian-language surnames